The St. James Canadians were a Canadian junior hockey team in the Manitoba Junior Hockey League until 2003, folding officially in 2004.  The Canadians played out of the St. James Civic Centre, in Winnipeg, Manitoba.  As the Winnipeg Braves, they won the 1959 Memorial Cup as National Junior Hockey champions.

History

Winnipeg Braves
The Winnipeg Braves were founded in 1956 and affiliated with the Winnipeg Warriors (minor pro) of the Western Hockey League (minor pro). The Braves played regular season games at Winnipeg's Olympic Rink and won 2 Turnbull Cup Championships as Manitoba Junior Champions (1959 and 1965).

The 1958-59, Braves won the Abbott Cup as Western Canadian Junior ‘A’ Champions, and were the last team from Winnipeg to win the Memorial Cup as National Champions. Under the leadership of manager Bill Addison and coach Bill Allum, the Braves defeated the Peterborough Petes coached by 25-year-old Scotty Bowman. In the championship series, the Petes won the first game 5-4, and the Braves came back to win four straight games 5-2, 5-2, 5-3 and 6-2. The final game of the series was played in Brandon, Manitoba due to the Shrine Circus appearing at Winnipeg Arena. The team included future NHL'ers Ted Green and Ernie Wakely.

Roster: Pat Angers, Don Atamanchuk, Al Baty, Gary Bergman, Ernie Bradawaski, Rene Brunel, Ted Green, Howie Hughes, Allan Ingimundson, Ken King, Ted Knight, Jerry Kruk, Laurie Langrell, Wayne Larkin, Al LeBlanc, Bob Leiter, Doug Monro, Zenon Moroz, Lew Mueller, John Rodger, Paul Sexsmith, John Sutherland, Bob Wales, Wayne Winstone, Ernie Wakely, J. D. (Jack) Perrin Jr. (President), Bill Addison (Manager), Bill Allum (Coach), Jim Drury (Trainer).

The Memorial Cup Championship team was inducted into the Manitoba Sports Hall of Fame and Museum in 2003, and inducted into the Manitoba Hockey Hall of Fame in the team category.

Prior to the 1966-67 season, the team moved to St. James and changed its name to the St. James Braves.

St. James Canadians
During the summer of 1967, a community-minded sports group purchased the St. James Braves from Ben Hatskin.  The team relocated to the brand new St. James Civic Centre, where they played as the St. James Canadians.

The Canadians won the Turnbull Cup three times (1968, 1996, 1997) throughout their 35 years in the MJHL.  They played until the end of the 2002-03 season.  The team took a one-year leave of absence from the MJHL in 2003-04 before ceasing operations .

Season-by-season record
Note: GP = Games Played, W = Wins, L = Losses, T = Ties, OTL = Overtime Losses, GF = Goals for, GA = Goals against

Playoffs
1971 Lost Semi-final
St. James Canadians defeated Winnipeg Monarchs 4-games-to-2
St. Boniface Saints defeated St. James Canadians 4-games-to-none
1972 Lost Semi-final
St. James Canadians defeated Winnipeg Monarchs 4-games-to-2
West Kildonan North Stars defeated St. James Canadians 4-games-to-1
1973 Lost Semi-final
St. James Canadians defeated West Kildonan North Stars 9-points-to-7
St. Boniface Saints defeated St. James Canadians 4-games-to-none
1974 Lost Quarter-final
St. Boniface Saints defeated St. James Canadians 4-games-to-2
1975 Lost Semi-final
St. James Canadians defeated St. Boniface Saints 4-games-to-none
West Kildonan North Stars defeated St. James Canadians 4-games-to-2
1976 Lost Semi-final
St. James Canadians defeated St. Boniface Saints 4-games-to-1
West Kildonan North Stars defeated St. James Canadians 4-games-to-3
1977 Lost Quarter-final
Kildonan North Stars defeated St. James Canadians 4-games-to-1
1978 Lost Quarter-final
Kenora Thistles defeated St. James Canadians 4-games-to-1
1979 Lost Quarter-final
St. Boniface Saints defeated St. James Canadians 4-games-to-1
1980 Lost Semi-final
St. James Canadians defeated Fort Garry Blues 4-games-to-2
Kildonan North Stars defeated St. James Canadians 4-games-to-2
1981 Lost Semi-final
St. James Canadians defeated Fort Garry Blues 4-games-to-1
St. Boniface Saints defeated St. James Canadians 4-games-to-1
1982 Lost Quarter-final
St. Boniface Saints defeated St. James Canadians 4-games-to-2
1983 Lost Quarter-final
Fort Garry Blues defeated St. James Canadians 4-games-to-none
1984 Lost Quarter-final
Fort Garry Blues defeated St. James Canadians 4-games-to-1
1985 Lost Semi-final
St. James Canadians defeated Thunder Bay Hornets 4-games-to-2
Winnipeg South Blues defeated St. James Canadians 4-games-to-1
1986 Lost Semi-final
St. James Canadians defeated St. Boniface Saints 4-games-to-3
Winnipeg South Blues defeated St. James Canadians 4-games-to-none
1987 Lost Quarter-final
Winnipeg South Blues defeated St. James Canadians 4-games-to-none
1988 Lost Semi-final
St. James Canadians defeated St. Boniface Saints 4-games-to-1
Winnipeg South Blues defeated St. James Canadians 4-games-to-2
1989 Lost Quarter-final
Winnipeg South Blues defeated St. James Canadians 4-games-to-1
1990 Lost Semi-final
St. James Canadians defeated Winnipeg South Blues 4-games-to-none
Kildonan North Stars defeated St. James Canadians 4-games-to-3
1991 Lost Semi-final
St. James Canadians defeated St. Boniface Saints 4-games-to-3
Winnipeg South Blues defeated St. James Canadians 4-games-to-1
1992 Lost Final, Hosted and Eliminated in 1992 Centennial Cup round robin
St. James Canadians defeated Neepawa Natives 4-games-to-1
St. James Canadians defeated Winnipeg South Blues 4-games-to-none
Winkler Flyers defeated St. James Canadians 4-games-to-1
Fifth and eliminated in 1992 Centennial Cup round robin (1-3)
1993 Lost Quarter-final
Winnipeg South Blues defeated St. James Canadians 4-games-to-2
1994 Lost Semi-final
St. James Canadians defeated Southeast Blades 4-games-to-1
St. Boniface Saints defeated St. James Canadians 4-games-to-1
1995 Lost Quarter-final
Winnipeg South Blues defeated St. James Canadians 4-games-to-2
1996 Won League, Lost Anavet Cup
St. James Canadians defeated Selkirk Steelers 4-games-to-3
St. James Canadians defeated Winnipeg South Blues 4-games-to-none
St. James Canadians defeated Neepawa Natives 4-games-to-3 MJHL CHAMPIONS
Melfort Mustangs (SJHL) defeated St. James Canadians 4-games-to-none
1997 Won League, Lost Anavet Cup
St. James Canadians defeated Winnipeg South Blues 4-games-to-1
St. James Canadians defeated Selkirk Steelers 4-games-to-none
St. James Canadians defeated OCN Blizzard 4-games-to-1 MJHL CHAMPIONS
Weyburn Red Wings (SJHL) defeated St. James Canadians 4-games-to-1
1998 Lost Final
St. James Canadians defeated Selkirk Steelers 4-games-to-2
St. James Canadians defeated Winnipeg South Blues
Winkler Flyers defeated St. James Canadians 4-games-to-1
1999 Lost Quarter-final
St. Boniface Saints defeated St. James Canadians 4-games-to-2
2000 Lost Quarter-final
Winkler Flyers defeated St. James Canadians 4-games-to-3
2001 DNQ
2002 Lost Semi-final
St. James Canadians defeated Winnipeg South Blues 4-games-to-3
Winkler Flyers defeated St. James Canadians 4-games-to-none
2003 DNQ

Notable alumni

External links
1959 Winnipeg Braves at Manitoba Hockey Hall of Fame

Defunct Manitoba Junior Hockey League teams
Ice hockey teams in Winnipeg
St. James, Winnipeg